John Balmain Brooke  (28 July 1907 – 6 August 1992) was a New Zealand teacher, yacht designer and manufacturer, mechanical engineer, engineering administrator. He was born in Auckland, New Zealand, on 28 July 1907.

In the 1946 New Year Honours, Brooke was appointed an Officer of the Order of the British Empire for services in connection with the production of munitions.

References

1907 births
1992 deaths
New Zealand educators
New Zealand Officers of the Order of the British Empire
20th-century New Zealand engineers